Municipal elections were held in the Czech Republic on 10–11 October 2014. Approximately 62,300 local council seats were elected. The date of the elections was announced by the President Miloš Zeman in June 2014.

Results

References

External links
2014 Czech municipal election (Ministry of the Interior of the Czech Republic) 

2014
Municipal elections
Czech municipal elections